Messari Al-Mashhari (born 14 January 2002) is a Saudi Arabian footballer for plays for Super League Greece 2 club Olympiacos B.

Career

Before the second half of 2021–22, Al-Mashhari signed for Greek side Olympiacos B. On 19 February 2022, he debuted for Olympiacos B during a 1–2 loss to AEL (Larissa).

References

External links

 

2002 births
Association football midfielders
Expatriate footballers in Greece
Living people
Saudi Arabian expatriate footballers
Saudi Arabian footballers
Super League Greece 2 players
Olympiacos F.C. B players
Saudi Arabian expatriate sportspeople in Greece
Al Nassr FC players